The Ministry of the Environment, Conservation and Parks is an Ontario government ministry responsible for protecting and improving the quality of the environment in the Canadian province of Ontario, as well as coordinating Ontario's actions on climate change.  This includes administration of government programs, such as Ontario's Drive Clean and Clean Water Act. The ministry headquarters are located inside the Ontario Government Buildings.

History
The Ministry of the Environment was originally established as a portfolio in the Executive Council of Ontario (or provincial cabinet) in 1972.

The ministry was merged with the Ministry of Energy to form the Ministry of Environment and Energy from 1993 to 1997, and briefly again in 2002, before being split back up again.

Following the 2014 Ontario election, the addition of climate change to the ministry's portfolio was announced on June 24, 2014, and its name changed from the Ministry of the Environment to the Ministry of the Environment and Climate Change.

Following the 2018 Ontario election, the Ministry's name was changed from the Ministry of the Environment and Climate Change to the Ministry of the Environment, Conservation and Parks on June 29, 2018.

Responsibilities

Air Quality 
The MECP works to improve air quality through legislation, targeted programs, and partnership agreements with other neighbouring airsheds. This includes using a network of air quality stations that provide real-time air pollution data. The ministry communicates air quality to the public by providing an Air Quality Index based on ambient levels of ozone, fine particulate matter, nitrogen dioxide, carbon monoxide, sulphur dioxide, and total reduced sulphur compounds.

Brownfields 
MECP is responsible for administering Ontario Regulation 153/04 which requires, under specific circumstances, a Record of Site Condition (RSC) to be submitted to the Ministry for acknowledgement. A RSC contains Environmental Site Assessments that ascertain the current condition of a site, including whether contamination exists on-site. The RSC is required when a property owner is choosing to change the property use from a less-sensitive to more-sensitive use (Example: Industrial Use to Residential Use) and is often required by the municipality's Chief Building Official before approval of a building permit.

Climate change 
The ministry released a climate change action plan in 2007, setting greenhouse gas reduction targets for the province. It is the aim of the provincial government to reduce its emissions to:
 6% below 1990 levels by 2014;
 15% below 1990 levels by 2020; and
 80% below 1990 levels by 2050.

The ministry released an update on its progress towards these targets in 2014, indicating that it had surpassed its 2014 target. It also indicated that current trends and policies would result in 170 megatonnes of emissions, or 69% of its 2020 target.

In 2011, the ministry published Climate Ready, its first climate change adaptation strategy and action plan for 2011 to 2014. The report acknowledges that Ontario has experienced a 1.4°C increase in average temperatures, and that the province is suffering from more frequent extreme weather events including prolonged heat waves, torrential rain and wind storms, and drought.  The report outlines how the province should prepare for and minimize the negative impacts of a changing climate, as well as strategies to reduce greenhouse gas emissions.

Under Ontario Regulation 452/09, any facility in Ontario that emits more than 25,000 tonnes of greenhouse gases annually is required to report their emissions. The reports must be verified by an accredited third party, to ensure it meets the requirements of ISO 14064-3. Reports are then submitted through Environment Canada's single window system.

A cap and trade program was implemented on January 1, 2017, which projected to cost the average Ontario household about $13 more per month to fuel a car and heat a home in 2017. By 2017 year end, the cap and trade program brought in nearly $2 billion in revenue. After Progressive Conservative Premier Doug Ford was sworn into office on June 29, 2018, he revoked Ontario's cap and trade program on July 3, 2018.

Drinking water 
Ontario municipalities have responsibility for building and maintaining drinking water systems, but the ministry regulates these systems to achieve acceptable standards in water quality and safety.

Drive Clean 

The ministry is responsible for administering Ontario's Drive Clean program. Certain cars, vans, trucks, motorhomes and buses must be evaluated under the Drive Clean program to check that they meet Ontario emissions standards before being licensed to drive on Ontario roads. On September 28, 2018, the Ontario government announced the cancellation of the Drive Clean program and instead focusing on heavy duty vehicles; the change would be effective on April 1, 2019.

Other 
 Environmental assessments
 Environmental approvals
 Environmental registry
 Environment maps
 Great Lakes and Watersheds
 Pesticides

List of Ministers

See also 
 Government of Ontario
 Ontario's Drive Clean program
 Hydro One - formerly part of Ontario Hydro
 Ontario Power Generation - formerly part of Ontario Hydro
 Flick Off

References

External links
 

1972 establishments in Ontario
Environment
Environment of Canada
Ontario
Ontario
Environmental agencies in Canada
Environmental agencies of country subdivisions
Ontario, Environment
Ontario